Balavan or Balvan may refer to:

Balvan, Kermanshah
Balavan, Lorestan